The South Korea women's national under-18 and under-19 basketball team is a national basketball team of South Korea and is governed by the Korea Basketball Association. 
It represents the country in international under-19 and under-18 (under age 19 and under age 18) women's basketball competitions.

See also
South Korea women's national basketball team
South Korea women's national under-17 basketball team
South Korea men's national under-19 basketball team

References

Women's national under-19 basketball teams
Basketball